Turanana taygetica is a butterfly of the family Lycaenidae. It was described by Rebel in 1902. It is found in Greece and Turkey.

The length of the forewings is 10–12 mm. The ground colour of the upperside of the wings is blue with blackish marginal borders. The underside ground colour is whitish grey. Adult males are often found watering inside the forest zone and near the presumed host-plant.

The larvae probably feed on Acantholimon species.

Subspecies
Turanana taygetica taygetica (Greece: Peloponnese)
Turanana taygetica endymionoides Coutsis, 2004 (western Asiatic Turkey, Greece: Peloponnese)

References

Butterflies described in 1902
Polyommatini
Butterflies of Europe